The decade of the 1880s in film involved significant events.

Events
1880 – American George Eastman begins to commercially manufacture dry plates for photography.
1880 – Eadweard Muybridge holds a public demonstration of his Zoopraxiscope, a magic lantern provided with a rotating disc with artist's renderings of Muybridge's chronophotographic sequences. It was used as a demonstration device by Muybridge in his illustrated lecture (the original preserved in the Museum of Kingston upon Thames in England).
January 1, 1881 – American inventor George Eastman founds the Eastman Dry Plate Company, eventually known as Kodak.
1882 – American inventor George Eastman begins experimenting with new types of photographic film, with his employee, William Walker.
1882 – French physiologist Étienne-Jules Marey invents the chronophotographic gun, the camera shaped like a rifle that photographs twelve successive images each second.
1885 – American inventors George Eastman and Hannibal Goodwin each invent a sensitized celluloid base roll photographic film to replace the glass plates then in use.
1887 – Hannibal Goodwin files for a patent for his photographic film.
1888 - Louis Le Prince creates the oldest surviving film, Roundhay Garden Scene. Recorded in Leeds, Yorkshire, England, the footage lasts a mere 2.11 seconds.
1888 – George Eastman files for a patent for his photographic film.
1888 – Thomas Edison meets with Eadweard Muybridge to discuss adding sound to moving pictures. Edison begins his own experiments.
1889 – American inventor George Eastman's celluloid base roll photographic film becomes commercially available.

Births
This a list of actors and filmmakers who were born between years 1880 and 1884. See also:
1885 born actors and filmmakers
1886 born actors and filmmakers
1887 born actors and filmmakers
1888 born actors and filmmakers
1889 born actors and filmmakers

Lists of films

See also
 Film
 History of film
 Lists of films

References 

 
Films by decade
Film by decade